Angekommen wie nicht da is a book by Nobel Prize-winning author Herta Müller. It was first published in 1994.

Release details

References 

1994 German novels
Works by Herta Müller
German-language novels